The following are the United States Football League standings, running from the league's 1983 founding through its 1985 closure. Team names shown in the standings reflect the teams' most recent names, as some changed cities during their existence.

See also
United States Football League

External links
 Remember the USFL
 USFL Online Hall of Fame